Boccard Point is a mountain summit in Jackson County, Oregon, United States with an elevation of .

Environs
Boccard Point is located in the Soda Mountain Wilderness, which was designated in the spring of 2009 by the United States Congress, and is managed by the Bureau of Land Management.

The surrounding wilderness encompasses a large amount of biological and geological diversity, covering the transition between Oregon's eastern deserts, and mountainous fir forests. The mountain and associated wilderness is located southeast of the cities of Medford and Ashland.

Trails
Since the designation of the Soda Mountain Wilderness, the road leading to Boccard Point had been decommissioned, and deterioration had made it difficult to traverse. In 2014, the trail was restored by the nonprofit Siskiyou Mountain Club.

Name
The mountain was named after the American biologist and environmentalist Bruce Boccard. Boccard Point was his favorite spot on the mountain and was a point he called "Juniper Ridge". In 1997, the U.S. Board on Geographic Names approved naming the point in his honor.

References

Mountains of Jackson County, Oregon
Mountains of Oregon
Ashland, Oregon